The Autostrada A29 is a  motorway on the island of Sicily that links Palermo to Mazara del Vallo. The motorway is also called Autostrada del Sale (Motorway of Salt) because one of its branches ends at the Salt Pans between Marsala and Trapani. 
It's a four-lane motorway in its whole length.

A29 entirely toll-free and managed by ANAS.

A segment of the highway near Capaci was the site of the bombing of Italian magistrate Giovanni Falcone and his wife Francesca Morvillo by the Sicilian Mafia.

Palermo - Mazara del Vallo

A29dir Diramazione Alcamo-Trapani

Also called Autostrada del Sale (The Salt Motorway).

A29dir Diramazione to Birgi

A29racc to Palermo Airport

References

Autostrade in Italy
Transport in Sicily